The 2006 Copa Sudamericana de Clubes, officially the 2006 Copa Nissan Sudamericana de Clubes for sponsorship reasons, was an international football championship competition that was played by 34 teams in total, including 31 CONMEBOL teams and also three invited teams from CONCACAF.

Pachuca won their first title in history after defeating Colo-Colo tying 1–1 in the first leg in Mexico, and winning 2–1 in Chile. Pachuca only lost one game in the tournament, against Colombian Deportes Tolima 2–1 in their debut.

This was the second time a Mexican club reached the final, after UNAM lost the 2005 edition to Boca Juniors. Meanwhile, this was also the first time a Chilean club arrived to a final since the tournament's inauguration in 2002.

Also, this was the first time a Mexican (or CONCACAF) representative won the Copa Sudamericana or any CONMEBOL-sanctioned tournament.

Qualified teams
The Copa Sudamericana 2006 tournament was the sixth edition of the Copa Sudamericana tournament.

First stage
The table gives the teams in the first round gathered in elimination groups of 2 teams or 4 teams. Teams hosting the first game are on the left. Advancing teams are in bold.

|-
!colspan="5"|Chile/Peru Preliminary

|-
!colspan="5"|Bolivia/Ecuador Preliminary

|-
!colspan="5"|Paraguay/Uruguay Preliminary

|-
!colspan="5"|Colombia/Venezuela Preliminary

|}

Second stage

|-

|-

|-

|-

|-

|-

|-

|-

|-

|-

|}

Knockout stages

(*)Indicates that the team plays at home for the first leg

Round of 16
The Round of 16 was played between September 26 and October 12 of 2006. It was played by the ten winners from the First Round, plus River Plate, Boca Juniors, Gimnasia y Esgrima, Alajuelense, Toluca and Pachuca. As in the First Round, these teams played two-legged matches. Team #1 played at home first.

|}

Quarterfinals
The Quarterfinals was played between October 18 and November 1 of 2006. The eight winners from the Round of 16. As in the First Round, these teams played two-legged matches. Team #1 played at home first.

|}

Semifinals
The Semifinals was played between November 15 to the 22nd of 2006. The four winners from the Quarterfinals. As in the First Round, these teams played two-legged matches. Team #1 played at home first.

|}

Finals

The finals were played between November 30 and December 13 of 2006. As in the First Round, these teams played two-legged matches to determine the champion. Team #1 played at home first.

|}

Top goalscorers

References

External links
Official site

2
Copa Sudamericana seasons